May Day is a European festival of ancient origins marking the beginning of summer, usually celebrated on 1 May, around halfway between the spring equinox and summer solstice. Festivities may also be held the night before, known as May Eve. Traditions often include gathering wildflowers and green branches, weaving floral garlands, crowning a May Queen (sometimes with a male companion), and setting up a Maypole, May Tree or May Bush, around which people dance. Bonfires are also part of the festival in some regions. Regional varieties and related traditions include Walpurgis Night in central and northern Europe, the Gaelic festival Beltane, the Welsh festival Calan Mai, and May devotions to the Blessed Virgin Mary. It has also been associated with the ancient Roman festival Floralia.

In 1889, 1 May was chosen as the date for International Workers' Day by the Second International, to commemorate the Haymarket affair in Chicago and the struggle for an eight-hour working day. As a result, International Workers' Day is also called "May Day", but the two are otherwise unrelated.

Origins and celebrations 

The earliest known May celebrations appeared with the Floralia, festival of Flora, the Roman goddess of flowers, held from 27 April – 3 May during the Roman Republic era, and the Maiouma or Maiuma, a festival celebrating Dionysus and Aphrodite held every three years during the month of May. The Floralia opened with theatrical performances. In the Floralia, Ovid says that hares and goats were released as part of the festivities. Persius writes that crowds were pelted with vetches, beans, and lupins. A ritual called the Florifertum was performed on either 27 April or 3 May, during which a bundle of wheat ears was carried into a shrine, though it is not clear if this devotion was made to Flora or Ceres. Floralia concluded with competitive events and spectacles, and a sacrifice to Flora.

Maiouma was celebrated at least as early as the 2nd century AD, when records show expenses for the month-long festival were appropriated by Emperor Commodus. According to the 6th-century chronicles of John Malalas, the Maiouma was a "nocturnal dramatic festival, held every three years and known as Orgies, that is, the Mysteries of Dionysus and Aphrodite" and that it was "known as the Maioumas because it is celebrated in the month of May-Artemisios". During this time, enough money was set aside by the government for torches, lights, and other expenses to cover a thirty-day festival of "all-night revels." The Maiouma was celebrated with splendorous banquets and offerings. Its reputation for licentiousness caused it to be suppressed during the reign of Emperor Constantine, though a less debauched version of it was briefly restored during the reigns of Arcadius and Honorius, only to be suppressed again during the same period.

A later May festival celebrated in Germanic countries, Walpurgis Night, commemorates the official canonization of Saint Walpurga on 1 May 870. In Gaelic culture, the evening of 30 April was the celebration of Beltane (which translates to "lucky fire") as well as the similar Welsh Calan Mai, and marks the start of the summer season. First attested in 900 AD, the celebration mainly focused on the symbolic use of fire to bless cattle and other livestock as they were moved to summer pastures. This custom continued into the early 19th century, during which time cattle would be made to jump over fires to protect their milk from being stolen by fairies. People would also leap over the fires for luck.

Since the 18th century, many Roman Catholics have observed May – and May Day – with various May devotions to the Blessed Virgin Mary. In works of art, school skits, and so forth, Mary's head will often be adorned with flowers in a May crowning. 1 May is also one of two feast days of the Catholic patron saint of workers St Joseph the Worker, a carpenter, husband to Mother Mary, and foster father of Jesus. Replacing another feast to St. Joseph, this date was chosen by Pope Pius XII in 1955 as a counterpoint to the communist International Workers' Day celebrations on May Day.

The best known modern May Day traditions, observed both in Europe and North America, include dancing around the maypole and crowning the Queen of May. Fading in popularity since the late 20th century is the tradition of giving of "May baskets," small baskets of sweets or flowers, usually left anonymously on neighbours' doorsteps.

In the late 20th century, many neopagans began reconstructing some of the older pagan festivals and combining them with more recently developed European secular and Catholic traditions, and celebrating May Day as a pagan religious festival.

In Europe

Belgium 
Locally known as 'Labour day' (Dutch: Dag van de arbeid, French: Fête du Travail), Belgium has celebrated May Day as a public holiday since 1948.

Bulgaria 
On May Day, Bulgarians celebrate Irminden (or Yeremiya, Eremiya, Irima, Zamski den). The holiday is associated with snakes and lizards and rituals are made in order to protect people from them. The name of the holiday comes from the prophet Jeremiah, but its origins are most probably pagan.

It is said that on the days of the Holy Forty or Annunciation snakes come out of their burrows, and on Irminden their king comes out. Old people believe that those working in the fields on this day will be bitten by a snake in summer.

In western Bulgaria people light fires, jump over them and make noises to scare snakes. Another custom is to prepare "podnici" (special clay pots made for baking bread).

This day is especially observed by pregnant women so that their offspring do not catch "yeremiya"—an illness due to evil powers.

Czech Republic 
In the Czech Republic, May Day is traditionally considered a holiday of love and May as a month of love. The celebrations of spring are held on 30 April when a maypole ("májka" in Czech) is erected—a tradition possibly connected to Beltane, since bonfires are also lit on the same day. The event is similar to German Walpurgisnacht, its public holiday on 30 April.
On 31 May, the maypole is taken down in an event called Maypole Felling.

On 1 May, couples in love kiss under a blooming tree. According to the ethnographer Klára Posekaná, this is not an old habit. It most likely originated around the beginning of the 20th century in an urban environment, perhaps in connection with Karel Hynek Mácha's poem Máj (which is often recited during these days) and Petřín. This is usually done under a cherry, an apple or a birch tree.

Estonia 
May Day or "Spring Day" (Kevadpüha) is a national holiday in Estonia celebrating the arrival of spring.

More traditional festivities take place throughout the night before and into the early hours of 1 May, on the Walpurgis Night (Volbriöö).

Finland 

In Finland, Walpurgis night ("") is one of the four biggest holidays along with Christmas Eve, New Year's Eve, and Midsummer. Walpurgis witnesses the biggest carnival-style festival held in Finland's cities and towns. The celebrations, which begin on the evening of 30 April and continue on 1 May, typically centre on the consumption of sima, sparkling wine and other alcoholic beverages. Since the end of the 19th century, this traditional upper-class feast has been appropriated by university students. Many  (university-preparatory high school) alumni wear the black and white student cap and many higher education students wear student coveralls. One tradition is to drink sima, a home-made low-alcohol mead, along with freshly cooked funnel cakes.

In France 
 
On 1 May 1561, King Charles IX of France received a lily of the valley as a lucky charm. He decided to offer a lily of the valley each year to the ladies of the court. At the beginning of the 20th century, it became custom to give a sprig of lily of the valley, a symbol of springtime, on 1 may. The government permits individuals and workers' organisations to sell them tax-free on that single day. Nowadays, people may present loved ones either with bunches of lily of the valley or dog rose flowers.

In Germany 

In rural regions of Germany, especially the Harz Mountains, Walpurgisnacht celebrations of pagan origin are traditionally held on the night before May Day, including bonfires and the wrapping of a Maibaum (maypole). Young people use this opportunity to party, while the day itself is used by many families to get some fresh air. Motto: "Tanz in den Mai" ("Dance into May").

In the Rhineland, 1 May is also celebrated by the delivery of a maypole, a tree covered in streamers to the house of a girl the night before. The tree is typically from a love interest, though a tree wrapped only in white streamers is a sign of dislike. Women usually place roses or rice in the form of a heart at the house of their beloved one. It is common to stick the heart to a window or place it in front of the doormat. In leap years, it is the responsibility of the women to place the maypole. All the action is usually done secretly and it is an individual's choice whether to give a hint of their identity or stay anonymous.

May Day was not established as a public holiday until Nazi Germany declared 1 May a "national workers' day" in 1933. As Labour Day, many political parties and unions host activities related to work and employment.

Greece 
1 May is a day that celebrates Spring.

Maios (Latin Maius), the month of May, took its name from the goddess Maia (Gr ), a Greek and Roman goddess of fertility. The day of Maios (Modern Greek Πρωτομαγιά) celebrates the final victory of the summer against winter as the victory of life against death. The celebration is similar to an ancient ritual associated with another minor demi-god Adonis which also celebrated the revival of nature. There is today some conflation with yet another tradition, the revival or marriage of Dionysus (the Greek God of theatre and wine-making). This event, however, was celebrated in ancient times not in May but in association with the Anthesteria, a festival held in February and dedicated to the goddess of agriculture Demeter and her daughter Persephone. Persephone emerged every year at the end of Winter from the Underworld. The Anthesteria was a festival of souls, plants and flowers, and Persephone's coming to earth from Hades marked the rebirth of nature, a common theme in all these traditions.

What remains of the customs today, echoes these traditions of antiquity. A common, until recently, May Day custom involved the annual revival of a youth called Adonis, or alternatively of Dionysus, or of Maios (in Modern Greek Μαγιόπουλο, the Son of Maia). In a simple theatrical ritual, the significance of which has long been forgotten, a chorus of young girls sang a song over a youth lying on the ground, representing Adonis, Dionysus or Maios. At the end of the song, the youth rose up and a flower wreath was placed on his head.

The most common aspect of modern May Day celebrations is the preparation of a flower wreath from wild flowers, although as a result of urbanisation there is an increasing trend to buy wreaths from flower shops. The flowers are placed on the wreath against a background of green leaves and the wreath is hung either on the entrance to the family house/apartment or on a balcony. It remains there until midsummer night. On that night, the flower wreaths are set alight in bonfires known as Saint John's fires. Youths leap over the flames consuming the flower wreaths. This custom has also practically disappeared, like the theatrical revival of Adonis/Dionysus/Maios, as a result of rising urban traffic and with no alternative public grounds in most Greek city neighbourhoods.

Ireland 
May Day has been celebrated in Ireland since pagan times as the feast of Beltane and in latter times as Mary's day. Traditionally, bonfires were lit to mark the coming of summer and to grant luck to people and livestock. Officially Irish May Day holiday is the first Monday in May. The tradition of a MayBush was reported as being suppressed by law and the magistrates in Dublin in the 18th century. Old traditions such as bonfires are no longer widely observed, though the practice still persists in some places across the country. Limerick, Clare and many other people in other counties still keep on this tradition, including areas in Dublin city such as Ringsend.

Italy 
In Italy it is called Calendimaggio or cantar maggio a seasonal feast held to celebrate the arrival of spring. The event takes its name from the period in which it takes place, that is, the beginning of May, from the Latin calenda maia. The Calendimaggio is a tradition still alive today in many regions of Italy as an allegory of the return to life and rebirth: among these Piedmont, Liguria, Lombardy, Emilia-Romagna (for example, is celebrated in the area of the Quattro Province or Piacenza, Pavia, Alessandria and Genoa), Tuscany and Umbria. This magical-propitiatory ritual is often performed during an almsgiving in which, in exchange for gifts (traditionally eggs, wine, food or sweets), the Maggi (or maggerini) sing auspicious verses to the inhabitants of the houses they visit. Throughout the Italian peninsula these Il Maggio couplets are very diverse—most are love songs with a strong romantic theme, that young people sang to celebrate the arrival of spring. Roman families traditionally eat pecorino with fresh fava beans during an excursion in the Roman Campagna. Symbols of spring revival are the trees (alder, golden rain) and flowers (violets, roses), mentioned in the verses of the songs, and with which the maggerini adorn themselves. In particular the plant alder, which grows along the rivers, is considered the symbol of life and that's why it is often present in the ritual.

Calendimaggio can be historically noted in Tuscany as a mythical character who had a predominant role and met many of the attributes of the god Belenus. In Lucania, the 'Maggi' have a clear auspicious character of pagan origin. In Syracuse, Sicily, the Albero della Cuccagna (cf. "Greasy pole") is held during the month of May, a feast celebrated to commemorate the victory over the Athenians led by Nicias. However, Angelo de Gubernatis, in his work Mythology of Plants, believes that without doubt the festival was previous to that of said victory.

It is a celebration that dates back to ancient peoples, and is very integrated with the rhythms of nature, such as the Celts (celebrating Beltane), Etruscans and Ligures, in which the arrival of summer was of great importance.

Poland 
In Poland, there is a state holiday on 1 May. It is currently celebrated without a specific connotation, and as such it is May Day. However, due to historical connotations, most of the celebrations are focused around Labour Day festivities. It is customary for labour activists and left-wing political parties to organize parades in cities and towns across Poland on this day. The holiday is also commonly referred to as "Labour Day" ("Święto Pracy").

The May Day in Poland is closely followed by another state holiday, 3 May Constitution Day. The Parliamentary Act of 20 February 2004 introduced the Polish National Flag Day observed on 2 May. While not a public holiday, together with the other two it constitutes the so-called "Majówka"—a three-day celebration period often considered the beginning of the barbecue season in the country.

Portugal 

"Maias" is a superstition throughout Portugal, with special focus on the northern territories and rarely elsewhere. Maias is the dominant naming in Northern Portugal, but it may be referred to by other names, including Dia das Bruxas (Witches' day), O Burro (the Donkey, referring to an evil spirit) or the last of April, as the local traditions preserved to this day occur on that evening only. People put the yellow flowers of broom, the bushes are known as giestas. The flowers of the bush are known as Maias, which are placed on doors or gates and every doorway of houses, windows, granaries, currently also cars, which the populace collect on the evening of 30 April when the Portuguese brooms are blooming, to defend those places from bad spirits, witches and the evil eye. The placement of the May flower or bush in the doorway must be done before midnight.

These festivities are a continuum of the "Os Maios" of Galiza. In ancient times, this was done while playing traditional night-music. In some places, children were dressed in these flowers and went from place to place begging for money or bread. On 1 May, people also used to sing "Cantigas de Maio", traditional songs related to this day and the whole month of May.

The origin of this tradition can be traced to the Catholic Church story of Mary and Joseph fleeing to Egypt to protect Jesus from Herod. It was said that brooms could be found at the door of the house holding Jesus, but when Herod's soldiers arrived to the place they found every door decorated with brooms.

Romania 
On May Day, the Romanians celebrate the arminden (or armindeni), the beginning of summer, symbolically tied with the protection of crops and farm animals. The name comes from Slavonic Jeremiinŭ dĭnĭ, meaning prophet Jeremiah's day, but the celebration rites and habits of this day are apotropaic and pagan (possibly originating in the cult of the god Pan).

The day is also called ziua pelinului ("mugwort day") or ziua bețivilor ("drunkards' day") and it is celebrated to ensure good wine in autumn and, for people and farm animals alike, good health and protection from the elements of nature (storms, hail, illness, pests). People would have parties in natural surroundings, with lăutari (fiddlers) for those who could afford it. Then it is customary to roast and eat lamb, along with new mutton cheese, and to drink mugwort-flavoured wine, or just red wine, to refresh the blood and get protection from diseases. On the way back, the men wear lilac or mugwort flowers on their hats.

Other apotropaic rites include, in some areas of the country, people washing their faces with the morning dew (for good health) and adorning the gates for good luck and abundance with green branches or with birch saplings (for the houses with maiden girls). The entries to the animals' shelters are also adorned with green branches. All branches are left in place until the wheat harvest when they are used in the fire which will bake the first bread from the new wheat.

On May Day eve, country women do not work in the field as well as in the house to avoid devastating storms and hail coming down on the village.

Arminden is also ziua boilor (oxen day) and thus the animals are not to be used for work, or else they could die or their owners could get ill.

It is said that the weather is always good on May Day to allow people to celebrate.

Serbia 

"Prvomajski uranak" (Reveille on 1 May) is a folk tradition and feast that consists of the fact that on 1 May, people go in the nature or even leave the day before and spend the night with a camp fire. Most of the time, a dish is cooked in a kettle or in a barbecue. Among Serbs this holiday is widespread. Almost every town in Serbia has its own traditional first-of-may excursion sites, and most often these are green areas outside the city.

Spain 
May Day is celebrated throughout the country as Los Mayos (lit. "the Mays") often in a similar way to "Fiesta de las Cruces" in many parts of Hispanic America. One such example, in Galicia, is the festival "Fiesta de los Mayos" (or "Festa dos Maios" in Galician, the local language). It has a celtic origin (from the festivity of Beltane) and consists of different traditions, such as representations around a decorated tree or sculpture. People sing popular songs (also called maios,) making mentions to social and political events during the past year, sometimes under the form of a converse, while they walk around the sculpture with the percussion of two sticks. In Lugo and in the village of Vilagarcía de Arousa it was usual to ask a tip to the attendees, which used to be a handful of dry chestnuts (castañas maiolas), walnuts or hazelnuts. Today the tradition became a competition where the best sculptures and songs receive a prize.

In the Galician city of Ourense this day is celebrated traditionally on 3 May, the day of the Holy Cross, that in the Christian tradition replaced the tree "where the health, life and resurrection are," according to the introit of that day's mass.

In Catalunya, the May Day is not celebrated.

Sweden 
The more traditional festivities have moved to the day before, Walpurgis Night ("Valborgsmässoafton"), known in some locales as simply "Last of April" and often celebrated with bonfires and a good bit of drinking. The first of May is instead celebrated as International Workers' Day.

Turkey 
It has celebrated officially in Turkey for the first time in 1923. Since 2009, It is celebrated in Turkey as a public holiday on the first of May.

United Kingdom

England

Traditional English May Day rites and celebrations include crowning a May Queen and celebrations involving a maypole, around which dancers often circle with ribbons. Historically, Morris dancing has been linked to May Day celebrations. The earliest records of maypole celebrations date to the 14th century, and by the 15th century the maypole tradition was well established in southern Britain. The tradition persists into the 21st century in the Isle of Ely. Centenary Green part of the Octavia Hill Birthplace House, Wisbech has a flagpole which converts into a Maypole each year, used by local schools and other groups.

 
The early May bank holiday on the first Monday in May was created in 1978; May Day itself1 Mayis not a public holiday in England (unless it falls on a Monday). In February 2011, the UK Parliament was reported to be considering scrapping the bank holiday associated with May Day, replacing it with a bank holiday in October, possibly coinciding with Trafalgar Day (celebrated on 21 October), to create a "United Kingdom Day". Similarly, attempts were made by the John Major government in 1993 to abolish the May Day holiday and replace it with Trafalgar Day.

Unlike the other Bank Holidays and common law holidays, the first Monday in May is taken off from (state) schools by itself, and not as part of a half-term or end of term holiday. This is because it has no Christian significance and does not otherwise fit into the usual school holiday pattern. (By contrast, the Easter Holiday can start as late—relative to Easter—as Good Friday, if Easter falls early in the year; or finish as early—relative to Easter—as Easter Monday, if Easter falls late in the year, because of the supreme significance of Good Friday and Easter Day to Christianity.)

May Day was abolished and its celebration banned by Puritan parliaments during the Interregnum, but reinstated with the restoration of Charles II in 1660. 1 May 1707, was the day the Act of Union came into effect, joining the kingdoms of England (including Wales) and Scotland to form the Kingdom of Great Britain.

In Cambridgeshire villages, young girls went May Dolling (going around the villages with dressed dolls and collecting pennies). This dressing of dolls and singing was said to have persisted into the 1960s in Swaffham Prior

In Oxford, it is a centuries-old tradition for May Morning revellers to gather below the Great Tower of Magdalen College at 6am to listen to the college choir sing traditional madrigals as a conclusion to the previous night's celebrations. Since the 1980s some people then jump off Magdalen Bridge into the River Cherwell. There are still people who climb the barriers and leap into the water, causing themselves injury.

In Durham, students of the University of Durham gather on Prebend's Bridge to see the sunrise and enjoy festivities, folk music, dancing, madrigal singing and a barbecue breakfast. This is an emerging Durham tradition, with patchy observance since 2001.

Kingsbury Episcopi, Somerset, has seen its yearly May Day Festival celebrations on the May bank holiday Monday burgeon in popularity in the recent years. Since it was reinstated 21 years ago it has grown in size, and on 5 May 2014 thousands of revellers were attracted from all over the south-west to enjoy the festivities, with BBC Somerset covering the celebrations. These include traditional maypole dancing and morris dancing, as well as contemporary music acts.

Whitstable, Kent, hosts a good example of more traditional May Day festivities, where the Jack in the Green festival was revived in 1976 and continues to lead an annual procession of morris dancers through the town on the May bank holiday. A separate revival occurred in Hastings in 1983 and has become a major event in the town calendar. A traditional sweeps festival is performed over the May bank holiday in Rochester, Kent, where the Jack in the Green is woken at dawn on 1 May by Morris dancers.

At 7:15 p.m. on 1 May each year, the Kettle Bridge Clogs morris dancing side dance across Barming Bridge (otherwise known as the Kettle Bridge), which spans the River Medway near Maidstone, to mark the official start of their morris dancing season.

The Maydayrun involves thousands of motorbikes taking a  trip from Greater London (Locksbottom) to the Hastings seafront, East Sussex. The event has been taking place for almost 30 years now and has grown in interest from around the country, both commercially and publicly. The event is not officially organised; the police only manage the traffic, and volunteers manage the parking.

Padstow in Cornwall holds its annual Obby-Oss (Hobby Horse) day of festivities. This is believed to be one of the oldest fertility rites in the UK; revellers dance with the Oss through the streets of the town and even though the private gardens of the citizens, accompanied by accordion players and followers dressed in white with red or blue sashes who sing the traditional "May Day" song. The whole town is decorated with springtime greenery, and every year thousands of onlookers attend. Before the 19th century, distinctive May Day celebrations were widespread throughout West Cornwall, and are being revived in St. Ives and Penzance.

Kingsand, Cawsand and Millbrook in Cornwall celebrate Flower Boat Ritual on the May Day bank holiday. A model of the ship The Black Prince is covered in flowers and is taken in a procession from the Quay at Millbrook to the beach at Cawsand where it is cast adrift. The houses in the villages are decorated with flowers and people traditionally wear red and white clothes. There are further celebrations in Cawsand Square with Morris dancing and May pole dancing.

Scotland

May Day has been celebrated in Scotland for centuries. It was previously closely associated with the Beltane festival. Reference to this earlier celebration is found in poem 'Peblis to the Play', contained in the Maitland Manuscripts of fifteenth- and sixteenth-century Scots poetry:

At Beltane, quhen ilk bodie bownis
To Peblis to the Play,
To heir the singin and the soundis;
The solace, suth to say,
Be firth and forrest furth they found
Thay graythis tham full gay;
God wait that wald they do that stound,
For it was their feast day the day they celebrate May Day,
Thay said, [...]

The poem describes the celebration in the town of Peebles in the Scottish Borders, which continues to stage a parade and pageant each year, including the annual ‘Common Riding’, which takes place in many towns throughout the Borders. As well as the crowning of a Beltane Queen each year, it is custom to sing ‘The Beltane Song’.

John Jamieson, in his Etymological Dictionary of the Scottish Language (1808) describes some of the May Day/Beltane customs which persisted in the eighteenth and early nineteenth centuries in parts of Scotland, which he noted were beginning to die out. In the nineteenth century, folklorist Alexander Carmichael (1832–1912), collected the song Am Beannachadh Bealltain (The Beltane Blessing) in his Carmina Gadelica, which he heard from a crofter in South Uist.

Scottish May Day/Beltane celebrations have been somewhat revived since the late twentieth century. Both Edinburgh and Glasgow organise May Day festivals and rallies. In Edinburgh, the Beltane Fire Festival is held on the evening of May eve and into the early hours of May Day on the city's Calton Hill. An older Edinburgh tradition has it that young women who climb Arthur's Seat and wash their faces in the morning dew will have lifelong beauty. At the University of St Andrews, some of the students gather on the beach late on 30 April and run into the North Sea at sunrise on May Day, occasionally naked. This is accompanied by torchlit processions and much elated celebration.

Wales 
In Wales the first day of May is known as Calan Mai or Calan Haf, and parallels the festival of Beltane and other May Day traditions in Europe.

Traditions would start the night before (Nos Galan Haf) with bonfires, and is considered a Ysbrydnos or spirit night when people would gather hawthorn (draenen wen) and flowers to decorate their houses, celebrating new growth and fertility. While on May Day celebrations would include summer dancing (dawnsio haf) and May carols (carolau mai or carolau haf) othertimes referred to as "singing under the wall" (canu dan y pared), May Day was also a time for officially opening a village green (twmpath chwarae).

North America

Canada 
May Day is celebrated in some parts of the provinces of British Columbia, Quebec, New Brunswick and Ontario.

Toronto

In Toronto, on the morning of 1 May, various Morris Dancing troops from Toronto and Hamilton gather on the road by Grenadier Cafe, in High Park to "dance in the May". The dancers and crowd then gather together and sing traditional May Day songs such as Hal-An-Tow and Padstow.

British Columbia

Celebrations often take place not on 1 May but during the Victoria Day long weekend, later in the month and when the weather is likely to be better. The longest continually observed May Day in the British Commonwealth is held in the city of New Westminster, BC. There, the first May Day celebration was held on 4 May 1870.

United States 
Main: Labor Day vs. May Day

May Day was also celebrated by some early European settlers of the American continent. In some parts of the United States, May baskets are made. These are small baskets usually filled with flowers or treats and left at someone's doorstep. The giver rings the bell and runs away.

Modern May Day ceremonies in the U.S. vary greatly from region to region and many unite both the holiday's "Green Root" (pagan) and "Red Root" (labour) traditions.

May Day celebrations were common at women's colleges and academic institutions in the late nineteenth and early twentieth century, a tradition that continues at Bryn Mawr College and Brenau University to this day.

In Minneapolis, the May Day Parade and Festival is presented annually by In the Heart of the Beast Puppet and Mask Theatre on the first Sunday in May, and draws around 50,000 people to Powderhorn Park. On 1 May itself, local Morris Dance sides converge on an overlook of the Mississippi River at dawn, and then spend the remainder of the day dancing around the metro area.

Hawaii

In Hawaii, May Day is also known as Lei Day, and it is normally set aside as a day to celebrate island culture in general and the culture of the Native Hawaiians in particular. Invented by poet and local newspaper columnist Don Blanding, the first Lei Day was celebrated on 1 May 1927 in Honolulu. Leonard "Red" and Ruth Hawk composed "May Day Is Lei Day in Hawai'i," the traditional holiday song.

See also 

 Flores de Mayo, a similar holiday celebrated throughout the month of May in the Philippines
 Beltane, the Gaelic May Day festival
 Fiesta de las Cruces, a holiday celebrated 3 May in many parts of Spain and Hispanic America
 List of films set around May Day
 List of occasions known by their dates
 May devotions to the Blessed Virgin Mary
 Maypole
 May Queen
 Dano, a holiday celebrated on the 5th day of the 5th lunar month in Korea

References

External links 

 
 
 
 
 
 

 
Germanic paganism
International observances
Modern paganism in the United Kingdom
Public holidays in Finland
Public holidays in the Republic of Ireland
Public holidays in Norway
Public holidays in Sri Lanka
Public holidays in Sweden
Polish flag flying days